The 2018–19 season was the 122nd season of competitive football in Scotland. The domestic season began on 14 July 2018, with the first round of matches in the 2018–19 Scottish League Cup. The 2018–19 Scottish Professional Football League season commenced on 4 August.

Transfer deals

Celtic sold striker Moussa Dembélé to Lyon for €22 million (about £19.7 million), a record transfer fee received by a Scottish club.

League competitions

Scottish Premiership

Scottish Championship

Scottish League One

Scottish League Two

Non-league football

Level 5

Level 6

SPFL Reserve League

In 2018, the Development League was abolished and replaced by a reserve team competition.

Honours

Non-league honours

Senior

Junior
West Region

East Region

North Region

Reserve honours

Individual honours

PFA Scotland awards

SFWA awards

SPFL awards

Scottish clubs in Europe

Summary

Celtic
UEFA Champions League
Celtic started in the first qualifying round of the 2018–19 UEFA Champions League, and were drawn against Armenian club Alashkert.

UEFA Europa League
Having lost in the third qualifying round of the Champions League, Celtic dropped into the play-off round of the 2018–19 UEFA Europa League.

Group stage

Celtic finished second in Group B, and progressed to the knockout rounds.

Knockout stage

Aberdeen
UEFA Europa League

Having finished second in the 2017–18 Scottish Premiership, Aberdeen started in the second qualifying round of the 2018–19 UEFA Europa League.

Rangers
UEFA Europa League

Rangers started in the first qualifying round of the 2018–19 UEFA Europa League, where they were drawn to play Macedonian club Shkupi.

Group stage

Hibernian
UEFA Europa League

Hibernian started in the first qualifying round of the 2018–19 UEFA Europa League, and were paired with Faroese club Runavík.

Scotland national team

Women's football

League and Cup honours

Individual honours

SWPL awards

Scottish Women's Premier League

SWPL 1

SWPL 2

UEFA Women's Champions League

Glasgow City
Glasgow City entered the Champions League in the qualifying round.

Scotland women's national team

With a 2–1 win against Albania in the final round of group fixtures, Scotland qualified for their first World Cup finals tournament by winning UEFA Group 2.

Deaths

8 July: Alan Gilzean, 79, Dundee and Scotland forward.
14 July: Davie McParland, 83, Partick Thistle winger; Partick Thistle, Queen's Park and Hamilton Academical manager; Celtic assistant manager.
21 July: Allan Ball, 75, Queen of the South goalkeeper.
c.23 July: Jimmy Copeland, 76, Kilmarnock, Dumbarton, Montrose and Clyde forward.
10 August: Alan Hercher, 52, Inverness Caledonian Thistle midfielder.
September: George O'Hara, Dundee and Queen of the South forward.
24 September: Jim Brogan, 74, Celtic, Ayr United and Scotland full-back.
31 October: Johnny Graham, 73, Third Lanark, Dundee United, Falkirk, Hibernian and Ayr United midfielder.
13 November: William Mullan, 90, referee.
13 November: David Stewart, 71, Ayr United and Scotland goalkeeper.
16 November: Flemming Nielsen, 84, Morton midfielder.
19 November: George Yardley, 76, East Fife goalkeeper and forward.
22 November: Len Campbell, 71, Dumbarton wing half.
1 January: Freddie Glidden, 91, Hearts and Dumbarton defender.
24 January: Hugh McIlvanney, 84, journalist.
5 February: Joe Fascione, 74, Dundee United winger.
9 February: Katharina Lindner, 39, Glasgow City forward.
9 February: Ian Ross, 72, Berwick Rangers manager.
17 February: Johnny Valentine, 88, Queen's Park, Rangers and St Johnstone defender.
4 March: Eric Caldow, 84, Rangers, Stirling Albion and Scotland defender; Stranraer manager.
7 March: Bobby Campbell, 77, Greenock Morton, St Mirren and Motherwell inside right.
12 April: Ivor Broadis, 96, Queen of the South forward.
22 April: Billy McNeill, 79, Celtic and Scotland defender; Clyde, Aberdeen and Celtic manager.
29 April: Stevie Chalmers, 83, Dumbarton, Celtic, Morton, Partick Thistle and Scotland forward.
13 May: George Smith, 75, referee.
26 May: Harry Hood, 74, Clyde, Celtic, Motherwell and Queen of the South forward; Albion Rovers and Queen of the South manager.
4 June: Lawrie Leslie, 84, Hibernian, Airdrie and Scotland goalkeeper.
17 June: Ian MacFarlane, 86, Aberdeen full-back.
19 June: Ernie Collumbine, 80/81, Stenhousemuir, East Stirlingshire, St Johnstone and Clydebank wing-half.
24 June: Bobby Brown, 87, Motherwell full-back.

References

 
Seasons in Scottish football
S
S
2018 sport-related lists